Van is an unincorporated community in Harney County, Oregon, United States.

Van post office was established in 1891 and named for local settler Van Middlesworth. The office closed in 1953. As of 2008, the former United States Forest Service Van Guard Station was for sale.

Climate
According to the Köppen Climate Classification system, Van has a semi-arid climate, abbreviated "BSk" on climate maps.

References

Unincorporated communities in Harney County, Oregon
1891 establishments in Oregon
Unincorporated communities in Oregon
Populated places established in 1891